This is a list of Jersey Twenty20 International cricketers.

In April 2018, the ICC decided to grant full Twenty20 International (T20I) status to all its members. Therefore, all Twenty20 matches played between Jersey and other ICC members after 1 January 2019 will be eligible for T20I status.

This list comprises all members of the Jersey cricket team who have played at least one T20I match. It is initially arranged in the order in which each player won his first Twenty20 cap. Where more than one player won his first Twenty20 cap in the same match, those players are listed alphabetically by surname.

Jersey played their first match with T20I status on 31 May 2019 against Guernsey during the 2019 T20 Inter-Insular Cup.

Key

List of players
Statistics are correct as of 17 July 2022.

References 

Jersey